Kihingo is a settlement in Nairobi, which is in Kenya's Central Province.

References 

Populated places in Central Province (Kenya)